Fallicambarus strawni, the saline burrowing crayfish, is a species of crayfish in the family Cambaridae. It is found in southeastern Oklahoma and western Arkansas.

The IUCN conservation status of Fallicambarus strawni is "LC", least concern, with no immediate threat to the species' survival. The IUCN status was reviewed in 2010.

References

Further reading

 
 
 

Cambaridae
Articles created by Qbugbot
Crustaceans described in 1966